The Atheriniformes, also known as the silversides, are an order of ray-finned fishes that includes the Old World silversides and several less-familiar families, including the unusual Phallostethidae. The order includes at least 354 species. They are found worldwide in tropical and temperate marine and freshwater environments.

Description 
Atheriniformes are generally elongated and silvery in colour, although exceptions do exist.

Members of the order usually have two dorsal fins, the first with flexible spines, and an anal fin with one spine at the front. The lateral line is typically weak or absent. Atheriniform larvae share several characteristics; the gut is unusually short, a single row of melanophores occurs along the back, and the fin rays do not become evident until some time after hatching. They scatter their eggs widely, with most species attaching them to aquatic plants.

Taxonomy 
Classification of the Atheriniformes is uncertain, with the best evidence for monophyly in the larval characteristics mentioned below. Their closest relatives are thought to be the Cyprinodontiformes.

Nelson 2016 recognizes the infraseries Atherinomorpha, part of the sub series Ovalentaria which includes the orders Atheriniformes, Beloniformes, and Cyprinodontiformes, citing the larval characteristics and supporting molecular studies of these taxa as support for monophyly of this grouping. The sister taxon to the Atherinomorpha appears to be the Mugiliformes.

Following Nelson (2006), the family Melanotaeniidae includes the subfamilies Bedotiinae, Melanotaeniinae, Pseudomugilinae, and Telmatherininae, to demonstrate their monophyly. However, in a 2004 study, a different classification scheme classifies the families Bedotiidae, Melanotaeniidae, and Pseudomugilidae (also include Telmatherinine genera) in a suborder Melanotaenioidei. Thus, the number of families in Atheriniformes varies from author to author.

Nelson 2016 classifies the families as follows:

 Order Atheriniformes
 Suborder Atherinopsoidei
 Family Atherinopsidae (New World silversides)
 Family Notocheiridae (Surf silversides)
 Suborder Atherinoidei
 Family Isonidae (Surf sardines)
 Family Melanotaeniidae (Rainbowfishes and blue eyes)
 Family Atherionidae (Pricklenose silversides)
 Family Dentatherinidae (Mercer's tusked silverside)
 Family Phallostethidae (Priapiumfishes)
 Family Atherinidae (Old World silversides)

Timeline of genera

References

 

 
Ray-finned fish orders
Articles which contain graphical timelines